John Mankiewicz (born February 18, 1954) is an American television and film executive producer and screenwriter. He was co-executive producer for House of Cards and Bosch, he co-created the television series The Street and has written and produced episodes for House M.D. and occasionally writes for The New Yorker.
 
He was born in New York City the son of Ilene Thelma (Korsen) and screenwriter Don Mankiewicz, a member of the Mankiewicz family.  He is a cousin of Ben Mankiewicz, Josh Mankiewicz and Nick Davis.

References

External links

Living people
1954 births
Television producers from New York City
American male screenwriters
Jewish American writers
Mankiewicz family
American television writers
Writers from New York City
American male television writers
Screenwriters from New York (state)